Borsongaon is a locality in Bongaigaon, surrounded by localities of Paglasthan, Borpara and Chapaguri with nearest railway station, New Bongaigaon railway station at New Bongaigaon.

See also
 Paglasthan
 Borpara, Bongaigaon
 Chapaguri, Bongaigaon
 Dhaligaon
 New Bongaigaon
 Mahabeersthan
 Dolaigaon
 BOC Gate, Bongaigaon

References

Neighbourhoods in Bongaigaon